Nakrakonda (also spelled Nakraconda) is a village and gram panchayat in Khoyrasol CD Block in Suri Sadar subdivision of Birbhum district in the Indian state of West Bengal.

Geography

Location
Khoyrasol, the CD Block headquarters, is 1.2 km away from Nakrakonda and Dubrajpur, the nearest town, is 10 km away. Suri, headquarters of the district, is 36 km away.

Gram panchayat
Villages in Nakrakanda gram panchayat are: Ahmadpur, Bastabpur, Bhadulia, Bhurjora, Birjuri, Gangarampur, Gangpur, Kharikabad, Naopara, Nakrakanda, Paschim Sibpur, Puratan Nagrakonda, Sagarbhanga, Sahebpur, Shermara, Shilabatpur and Uttar Hazaratpur.

Demographics
As per the 2011 Census of India, Naxrakanda had a total population of 2,683 of which 1,357 (51%) were males and 1,326 (49%) were females. Population below 6 years was 345. The total number of literates in Naxrakanda was 1,723 (73.70% of the population over 6 years).

Post Office
Nakrakonda has a delivery branch post office, with PIN 731125, under Khoyrasol sub office and Suri head office. Khoyrasol sub office has the same PIN. Branch offices with the same PIN are Babuijore, Barhara, Bhadulia, Geruapahari, Hazratpur, Jahidpur, Kankartala, Kendragoria, Nabasan, Pursundi, Rasa and Sagarbhanga.

Education
Nakraconda High School,  a co-educational higher secondary institution, has arrangements for teaching the following subjects: accountancy, Bengali, bio science, business economics & mathematics, chemistry, eco-geography, English, history, mathematics, philosophy, Physics and political science.

Culture
Nakrakonda Falguni Pathagar, a government-sponsored library, was established in 1978. It has its own pucca building.

Healthcare
Nakrakonda Rural Hospital with 30 beds is the main medical facility in the Khoyrasol CD Block. There are primary health centres at Barrah (10 beds), Panchra (PO Panchrahat) (6 beds) and Lokepur (6 beds).

References

Villages in Birbhum district